Yves Djidda (born July 14, 1988) is a footballer from Cameroon who currently plays for Gokulam FC.

Career
Djidda began his career in Cameroon and when he came to Israel he played for Hakoah Amidar Ramat Gan F.C. After that he moved to Maccabi Ahi Nazareth and he represented his new team against his previous team and scored a goal in the second play-off game, that helped his club to promote to the upper league.

Position
Djidda plays as a striker.

References

External links
 
 

1988 births
Living people
Cameroonian footballers
Cameroonian expatriate footballers
Expatriate footballers in Israel
Hapoel Nof HaGalil F.C. players
Hakoah Maccabi Amidar Ramat Gan F.C. players
Maccabi Ahi Nazareth F.C. players
Israeli Premier League players
Liga Leumit players
Association football forwards